Charles Amponsah Bosompem (born 22 December 2001) is a Ghanaian professional footballer who plays as defender for Ghanaian Premier League side Bechem United F.C.

Career 
Bosompem started his career with Bechem United and he made his debut during the 2019–20 season. On 2 February 2020, he made his debut in a goalless draw against Cape Coast Ebusua Dwarfs. He played in 6 league matches before the league was cancelled due to restrictions from the COVID-19 pandemic in Ghana.

In March 2020, the CEO of Bechem United, Nana Kwasi Darlington confirmed that the club was selling five of its most valuable players in the transfer window which included Bosompem, Moro Salifu and Yaw Annor. At the start of the 2020–21 season, he was still present at the club and was named on the club's squad list for the season. He started and played 50 minutes of their first win of the season which ended in a 1–0 victory against West African Football Academy (WAFA).

References

External links 

 

Living people
2001 births
Association football defenders
Ghanaian footballers
Bechem United F.C. players
Ghana Premier League players